is a Japanese industrial designer who known as the designer of Nissan's pike car series with its retro-future design. Currently, he is a professor of Keio University Shonan Fujisawa Campus (SFC), a guest design director for au, and the manager of his own company, waterdesign. He has collaborated with companies such as Nissan, Suzuki, Toyota (WiLL), Olympus, KDDI, and Cassina.

The S Cargo was not designed by Sakai. Sakai led the Pike designs and created a proposal for the Nissan Figaro, but the design selected for final production (first shown at the 1989 Tokyo Motor Show) was designed by Nissan's in-house design team, led by Jim Shimizu (Shimizu Jun).

Major works
 Nissan Motors

 Be-1 (1987)
 Pao (1989)
 Rasheen (1994)
 Suzuki SW-1 (1992)
 Olympus

 o-product (1988)
 Ecru (1991)
 au design project
 HEXAGON (2005)
 MACHINA (2005)
 DRAPE (2006)
 Toray
 torayvino aqua meister (2007)

References

External links
  
 waterdesign  
 Profile - from the Keio University SFC website 
 Profile - from au design project 
 Olympus O-Product

1947 births
Living people
Japanese industrial designers
Japanese automobile designers
Japanese motorcycle designers

Kyoto City University of Arts alumni
People from Kyoto